Woorabinda  is a rural town and locality in the Aboriginal Shire of Woorabinda, Queensland, Australia. It is an Aboriginal community.

Geography
Woorabinda is in Central Queensland, inland about two hours' drive west of Rockhampton.

The seasonal Mimosa Creek is nearby and is a source of local water. During rainy season, the town can be isolated due to road flooding. Access is via the Fitzroy Developmental Road, which is sealed north towards Duaringa and where it meets the Capricorn Highway to Rockhampton. To the south, it is gravel road to Bauhinia, where it meets the Dawson Highway and access to Gladstone.

East is the sealed Baralaba-Woorabinda Road, seasonally cut off by flooding. West has a number of cattle properties until the base of the Blackdown Tablelands, serviced by gravel roads.

There is also a sealed airstrip along the north road into town, used by chartered flights and aeromedical retrieval services. No commercial flights operate to the airstrip.

History 
Wadja (also known as Wadjigu, Wadya, Wadjainngo, Mandalgu, and Wadjigun) is an Australian Aboriginal language in Central Queensland. The language region includes  the local government areas of the Aboriginal Shire of Woorabinda and Central Highlands Region, including the Blackdown Tablelands. the Comet River, and the Expedition Range, and the towns of Woorabinda, Springsure and Rolleston.

The town's name was chosen by Herbert Cecil Colledge, the superintendent of the settlement in 1927 using Aboriginal words, woora meaning kangaroo and binda meaning camp.

Woorabinda was first established in 1927, with land gazetted from the County of Waroona, as a replacement for the Taroom Aboriginal Settlement. The land at Taroom was repossessed for the development of proposed Nathan Dam for the Dawson River Irrigation Scheme, which was ultimately never built.

Central Queensland had a high level of frontier violence and Aboriginal deaths, such as at Cullin-La-Ringo at nearby Springsure and Hornet Bank along the Dawson River. There was a forcible relocation of dispossessed survivors into government-controlled settlements starting from 1897, with the introduction of the Aboriginals Protection Act—initially at Taroom, and then Woorabinda.  Peoples from at least 17 different language groups were placed within the camp, some from as far as Mornington Island, and were under the control of a local Superintendent beneath the state Chief Protector of Aborigines. The movement of approximately 300 Taroom residents occurred via foot and hired truck over the 250 km. This walk from Taroom to Woorabinda was commemorated by the community with a supported re-enactment in 2014.

Woorabinda State School opened in 1928, closed in 1970 and subsequently reopened.

The Woorabinda community is the only DOGIT Aboriginal community within the Central Queensland region. DOGIT communities have a special type of land tenure which applies only to former Aboriginal reserves.  The land title is a system of community level land trusts, owned and administered by the local council.

At the 2006 census, Woorabinda had a population of 851.

Cape Bedford relocation

In May 1942, during World War II, a Lutheran Aboriginal mission at Cape Bedford on Cape York in far North Queensland was closed to become used as an army camp.  The relocation has also been attributed to governmental fears of Aboriginal loyalty to the German Lutheran pastor and possibly against non-Aboriginal Australian interests in favour of the Japanese.  The 254 Aboriginal residents, of Guugu Yimithirr identity, were forcibly relocated; initially to Townsville via road and boat, and then via train to the ironback dormitory at Woorabinda. This trip was poorly provisioned and people arrived at their end destination having been deprived of food and blankets during the winter overland trip.

There was tension between the Cape Bedford evacuees and the residents of Woorabinda, partially due to the strong Lutheran Christian beliefs held by those from Cape Bedford.  However, the evacuees also experienced many cultural experiences previously unavailable to them because of the strong church presence, such as corroborees. During this time, informal Lutheran church services and ministering were maintained by the evacuees to hold onto their Christian beliefs, creating a core strength of spiritual leadership within this group.  Choral singing started during this time within the Guugu Yimithirr language from translated hymns as part of their services, which became a core part of their future church identity.  They maintained a separate identity to the Woorabinda residents during the seven years they spent within the community.

Many died from sickness and exposure due to the poor sanitation and inadequate shelter from the frost and cold winter nights of the inland climate, which the Guugu Yimithirr peoples would not have previously experienced, as they were from a warm, humid coastal climate. The official number of deaths during this period was 33, but could have been up to 48.  There were 13 recorded births during that time.  During their time at Woorabinda, the Cape Bedford peoples experienced paid labour and schooling for the first time.

The survivors were allowed to return to Cape Bedford in 1949, after the war, to what is now known as Hopevale.  Most returned north, however, a small contingent remained, which maintained a presence and link to the north which remains to this day.

Economy

Woorabinda has also been identified as amongst Queensland's most disadvantaged suburbs, the others of which are also Indigenous townships.

Government service providers are the main source of employment, with local industry in the form of the takeaway cafe and Woorabinda Pastoral Company, owned by the council. The satellite Foleyvale Station is just north of Duaringa, and is included in the Woorabinda lands used pastorally.

Alcohol Management Plan

In 2008, the community and council voted for the total ban of alcohol consumption within the town limits to become a "dry" community.  The town has had a significant decrease in alcohol-fuelled violence since the Alcohol Management Plan was introduced.

As of 2013, there has been ongoing movement within the community for a reintroduction of alcohol, with a community-led vote majority for its reintroduction. This has been as part of a larger movement within Aboriginal communities of Queensland for Alcohol Management Plan reviews.

The town also hosts the Mimosa Creek Healing Centre, which is a detoxification and rehabilitation centre for men recovering from alcohol abuse.

Education 
Woorabinda State School is a government primary (Prep-6) school for boys and girls at Carbine Street. In 2017, the school had an enrolment of 144 students with 16 teachers and 19 non-teaching staff (13 full-time equivalent). It includes a special education program. The school motto is 'Proud and Deadly'. There is a school tuck shop which runs a paid canteen from which meals can be purchased by the community.  Part of the school includes the Community Indigenous Knowledge Centre, an initiative of the State Library of Queensland, which is for access by the community.

Wadja Wadja High School is a private secondary (7-12) school for boys and girls at 116 Munns Drive. In 2017, the school had an enrolment of 77 students with 4 teachers and 12 non-teaching staff (9 full-time equivalent). In 2020, there were 76 students attending the school, all of whom were Indigenous.

There is no government secondary school in Woorabinda. The nearest government secondary school is Baralaba State School (to Year 10) in Baralaba to the east; there is a  school bus service. There is no nearby secondary school offering schooling to Year 12; options are distance education or boarding school.

Amenities 
Woorabinda has a Knowledge Centre (library) operated by the Woorabinda Aboriginal Shire Council.

One Mob Fellowship is on Munns Drive (approx ). It is part of the Wesleyan Methodist Church.

Nations and Population

The two main groups of people in Woorabinda are the Gangulu Nation and the Wadja Nation, both of whom have Native Title claims to the land. The area claimed for the Wadja people is limited to the Woorabinda current land geography; the Gangulu nation expands as far south as Theodore, west past Blackwater, and east to Mount Morgan.

There is a much higher proportion of people under the age of 18 in Woorabinda than in the wider non-indigenous community. Half of the population is under the age of 25, which is significantly higher than the Australian 0–24 years age group, which is one third of the population.

Notable people

 Miiesha, ARIA Music Awards winning singer
 Reggie Cressbrook, North Queensland Cowboys NRL player
 Mick Gooda, Aboriginal activist, Australian Human Rights Commission's Aboriginal and Torres Strait Islander Social Justice Commissioner

References

Further reading
  — full text available
McIvor, Roy (2010). Cockatoo: My Life in Cape York. Stories and Art. Roy McIvor. Magabala Books. Broome, Western Australia. .

External links

 
 

Towns in Queensland
Australian Aboriginal missions
Aboriginal communities in Queensland
Central Queensland
1927 establishments in Australia
Populated places established in 1927
Queensland in World War II
Aboriginal Shire of Woorabinda
Localities in Queensland